Carlin Itonga (born 11 December 1982) is a former professional footballer who played as a striker.

Career
Itonga was born in the DR Congo, and raised in England. He began his career with Arsenal, winning the FA Youth Cup in 2001, but he made just one first-team appearance, as a substitute against Manchester United in the League Cup in November 2001. While at Arsenal, Itonga broke several youth team records, including once scoring seven goals in an under-19 match. He had a brief loan spell with Sheffield Wednesday, and also at Oxford United, in September 2002.

After leaving Arsenal in early 2003, Itonga had a brief spell at Enfield, before later playing Cambridge City, Kettering Town and Fisher Athletic.

Itonga retired from football in 2004 at the age of just 24 after a series of injuries. He has since been based in both his native DR Congo and London, working with football academies.

References

1982 births
Living people
English footballers
Democratic Republic of the Congo footballers
Association football forwards
Arsenal F.C. players
Sheffield Wednesday F.C. players
Oxford United F.C. players
Enfield F.C. players
Kettering Town F.C. players
Fisher Athletic F.C. players
Cambridge City F.C. players
21st-century Democratic Republic of the Congo people